was a Japanese judoka and wrestler. He was instrumental in founding the Japanese Amateur Wrestling Association and bringing the 1964 Olympics to Japan.

Biography
Originally a judo specialist and a secretary to Kanō Jigorō he helped popularize judo in the United States and Europe. He later received the Olympic Order from the International Olympic Committee for his contributions to judo and the Olympics. In 1929 Hatta held 4th dan in judo, and by 1952 progressed to the 7th dan. Judo became an Olympic sport only in 1964, and therefore at the 1932 Olympics Hatta competed in freestyle wrestling. After that he helped establish the Japanese Amateur Wrestling Association, and at the 1936 Olympics was the head coach of the national wrestling team. Later he served in the House of Councillors, the Japanese upper house of the legislature. 

In 1965, Hatta also helped Victor Koga to form the Japanese Sambo Federation. He had a son named Tadaaki Hatta who learned from him and also coached at the Olympics.

References 

1906 births
1983 deaths
Japanese sportsperson-politicians
Olympic wrestlers of Japan
Wrestlers at the 1932 Summer Olympics
Japanese male sport wrestlers
20th-century Japanese people
Presidents of the Japan Wrestling Federation